ω Leonis (Latinised as Omega Leonis, abbreviated to ω Leo or Omega Leo), is a star system located in the zodiac constellation of Leo. It is visible to the naked eye in the absence of light pollution, with an apparent visual magnitude of about 5.4. The distance to this star, as determined using parallax measurements, is around 108 light years from the Sun. Because of its location close to the ecliptic, it is subject to being obscured by the Moon, and potentially by planets.

This is a spectroscopic binary star system with an orbital period of 116.8 years and an eccentricity of 0.56. The primary is a G-type main sequence star with a spectral classification of G1 V. It has about 35% more mass than the Sun and shines six times as brightly from an outer atmosphere that has an effective temperature of 5940 K. The system is roughly 3.7 billion years old and is a member of the galactic thin disk population.

References

G-type main-sequence stars
Spectroscopic binaries
Leo (constellation)
Leonis, 02
Leonis, Omega
081858
046454
3754
Durchmusterung objects